Leisele is a small Belgian town in Alveringem near the French border with about 750 inhabitants.

Populated places in West Flanders
Alveringem